Daya Vivian Vaidya (born May 20, 1980) is an American actress. She is best known for her role as Nina Inara in the television series Unforgettable.

Early life
Vaidya was born on May 20, 1980 in Kathmandu, Nepal to an Indian Gujarati father and an Italian/Spanish-American mother. Her parents moved with her to Oakland, California when she was two years old. She began performing in plays and musicals at the age of eleven, as well as training in all forms of dance from tap, ballet and contemporary - to hip-hop. She went on to major in dance at UCLA and dance on scholarship at Alvin Ailey American Dance  Theater in New York City. She finished school with a BFA in Theater Arts from the University of California, Los Angeles. She currently resides in Los Angeles where she is supporting herself with a career in film and television.

Personal life
Vaidya is married to Don Wallace. They have a daughter, Leela Grace, born in 2009.  Vaidya gave birth to identical twin boys on July 25, 2012 in New York City; Jai Blue and Dev Eshaan.

Filmography

Film

Television

References

External links 

Living people
American film actresses
American television actresses
Actresses from Oakland, California
Actors from Kathmandu
1973 births
21st-century American women
American actresses of Indian descent
American people of Italian descent